Sinclair Pass (el. ) is a high mountain pass in Kootenay National Park between the Columbia and Kootenay Rivers to the northeast of present-day Radium Hot Springs in the province of British Columbia, Canada.

History
It was named after James Sinclair, a fur trading merchant from Red River colony. In 1841, under the guidance of Cree chief Maskepetoon, Sinclair travelled through the pass while leading an expedition consisting of 121 people from 23 Métis families from Red River Colony. They were hired by the Pugets Sound Agricultural Company to settle outside Cowlitz Farm and Fort Nisqually in modern Washington state. This was an attempt to get the northern bank of the Columbia River awarded to the United Kingdom of Great Britain and Ireland in any potential settlement in the Oregon boundary dispute.

See also
List of mountain passes

Citations

Bibliography

 
 

Mountain passes of British Columbia
Columbia Valley
Canadian Rockies